Gary Edward Lindstrom (January 8, 1944 - January 10, 2022) was an Emeritus Professor of Computer Science at the University of Utah, having previously taught at the University of Pittsburgh.  He retired in July 2007 and died on January 10, 2022.

Lindstrom made numerous contributions to areas of data management, verification, and programming language design, specification and implementation. He served as an IEEE Computer Society Distinguished Visitor. According to his website, Dr. Lindstrom served as the founding editor-in-chief the International Journal of Parallel Programming from 1986 to 1993. He co-edited, with Doug DeGroot, the book Logic Programming: Functions, Relations and Equations, which was first published by Prentice-Hall in 1986.

Lindstrom was a graduate of Carnegie Mellon University, where he earned B.S. and M.S. degrees in mathematics, and a Ph.D. in computer science under Alan Perlis.

References

1944 births
2022 deaths
American computer scientists
Carnegie Mellon University alumni
University of Utah faculty
People from Syracuse, New York